Igor Yakovlevich Stechkin (15 November 1922 – 28 November 2001) was a Russian small arms designer.


Designs 
Stechkin automatic pistol, 9mm machine pistol
TKB-506, prototype handgun designed to look like a cigarette lighter
TKB-486, a prototype submachine gun in 9×18mm
TKB-0116, prototype compact assault rifle, lost design competition to AKS74U
TKB-0146, prototype assault rifle entered in Project Abakan, but lost to AN-94
OC-01 Kobalt, double-action 9 mm revolver
OC-23 Drotik, 5.45 mm machine pistol
OC-27 Berdysh, 9 mm semi-automatic pistol
OC-33 Pernach, 9 mm machine pistol
OC-38 Stechkin silent revolver

See also
Boris Stechkin, his uncle

References 
Оружие И.Я. Стечкина , Официальный сайт Тульского государственного музея оружия, retrieved 2013-4-7
Памяти Стечкина, Ружьё. Российский оружейный журнал, 2001/6, retrieved 2013-4-7

External links 
Articles about Stechkin's designs (in Russian)
Игорь Яковлевич Стечкин и его легендарное оружие
Малогабаритный автомат Стечкина ТКБ-0116
http://www.pseudology.org/people/StechkinIY.htm

Firearm designers
Weapons scientists and engineers
1922 births
2001 deaths
Soviet inventors
Soviet engineers